The Esmeraldas-class corvettes are a class of corvette in service with the Ecuadorian Navy, built in Italy by Fincantieri, entering service in the early 1980s.

Construction and design
Six corvettes were ordered by the Ecuadorian Navy from the Italian shipbuilder Cantieri Navali Riuniti (CNR) (now part of Fincantieri) in 1978 or 1979. They were a developed version of CNR's Wadi Mragh missile corvettes built for Libya in the late 1970s, with more powerful engines giving a higher speed and revised armament and equipment.

Displacement is  full load. The ships have a crew of 51.

(No reload missiles are carried). An OTO Melara 76 mm Compact gun is fitted forward and a twin Bofors 40 mm anti-aircraft mount is fitted aft. Two triple 324 mm torpedo tubes are fitted, capable of launching Italian Whitehead A244 anti-submarine torpedoes. A helipad is positioned between the Exocet launchers and the Bofors mounts, allowing a Bell 206 helicopter to be operated, although no hangar is provided for the helicopter.

Sensors include a Selenia RAN-10S air/surface search radar, two Selenia Orion 10X fire control radars and a Thomson Sintra Diodon hull-mounted sonar.

Ships in the class

Service history
El Oro was badly damaged by a fire on 14 April 1985, and took two years to repair. Two of the ships had their torpedo tubes removed for transfer to the two s purchased from the British Royal Navy in 1991 (BAE Presidente Eloy Alfaro and BAE Morán Valverde). It was planned to upgrade the ships' combat and fire control systems in 1993–1994, but a lack of funds prevented these changes.

Three of the vessels of the class (Los Rios, Manabí and Loja) were refitted  to extend their life by Astinave, being re-delivered in 2017–2018. Changes included fitting a locally developed combat management system called Orion.

Citations

References
 
 
 
 

Corvette classes
Corvettes of the Ecuadorian Navy
Ships built by Fincantieri
Ships built in Italy
Ships of the Ecuadorian Navy